The Oxbow School is a private single semester arts school for high school juniors and seniors located in Napa, California, sitting near an oxbow of the Napa River. High school juniors and seniors can choose to attend in either the fall or spring semester with visual arts and academic focus.

The school trains students in painting, sculpture, printmaking, photography and digital media while still satisfying high school graduation requirements and preparing them for college admittance. The school was founded in 1997 and opened in 1999.

Academics 
Students are required to take one Science and Humanities class each as part of the morning routine. Some students also hire foreign language and math teachers to prevent their skills from slipping during the semester away. Physical Education is also a required course. In PE, students' choices include hiking, biking, gardening, running, and soccer. The school is accredited by the Western Association of Schools and Colleges (WASC) and Cognia.

References

External links
 
 Oxbow School on Semester Schools Network

High schools in Napa County, California
Semester schools
Education in Napa County, California
Private high schools in California